Dioscorea esculenta, commonly known as the lesser yam, is a yam species native to Island Southeast Asia and introduced to Near Oceania and East Africa by early Austronesian voyagers. It is grown for their edible tubers, though it has smaller tubers than the more widely-cultivated Dioscorea alata and is usually spiny.

Names
In Vietnam, it is called khoai từ or củ từ. It is used to make chè củ từ, also referred to as chè khoai từ. In Tagalog, it is known as tugi, while in Cebuano it is called apali. It is cultivated in Kerala, Goa, Konkan parts of Maharashtra India. In Malayalam, it is known as nana kizhangu or nheruvalli kizhangu or Cheru Kizhangu". In Goa it is called Kaate Kanaga (काटे कणगा ), It is a climber which needs support and goes coiling around the support.

History of cultivation
The lesser yam is the second most important yam crop among Austronesians. Like D. alata, it requires minimal processing, unlike the other more bitter yam species. However, it has smaller tubers than D. alata and is usually spiny. Like D. alata it was introduced to Madagascar and the Comoros by Austronesians, where it spread to the East African coast. They are also a dominant crop in Near Oceania, However, it did not reach to the furthest islands in Polynesia, being absent in Hawaii and New Zealand.

Starch grains identified to be from the lesser yam have been recovered from archaeological sites of the Lapita culture in Viti Levu, Fiji, dated to around 3,050 to 2,500 cal BP. D. esculenta is believed to have been introduced by the Lapita culture into New Guinea, along with agricultural innovations like wet cultivation. Traces of D. esculenta (along with D. alata, D. bulbifera, D. nummularia and D. pentaphylla) yams have also been identified from the Mé Auré Cave site in Moindou, New Caledonia, dated to around 2,700 to 1,800 BP. Remains of D. esculenta have also been recovered from archaeological sites in Guam, dated to around 1031 CE.

Taxonomy 
Belonging to the genus Dioscorea, Dioscorea esculenta describes the plant's ability to produce edible roots.

Description
The plant's stems are round and thin, with big, black compound spines that are 2–4 cm long. The leaves are soft, heart-shaped, and 5–8 cm long and 6–8 cm wide.

See also
Domesticated plants and animals of Austronesia
Yam production in Nigeria

References

External links

esculenta
Yams (vegetable)